William Samuel Roberts (12 July 1908 – 22 February 1976) was a Welsh footballer who played as a right back. He made over 170 Football League appearances in the years before  the Second World War.

Career
Bill Roberts was born in Bargoed and began his footballing career in the Army. He signed briefly for Tottenham Hotspur in 1932. Bob Hewison signed tough tackling Roberts in September 1933 for Bristol City. Bill Roberts followed Ernie Brinton to Newport County in July 1938. Roberts was captured by the Germans in France during the Second World War. Later Bill Roberts was landlord of the "Elm Tree" pub in Bishopsworth, Bristol then worked locally for HM Customs & Excise.  He died in Bristol, aged 67.

Honours
with Bristol City
Welsh Cup winner 1934

with Newport County
Football League Third Division South winner: 1938–39

References

1908 births
1976 deaths
People from Bargoed
Sportspeople from Caerphilly County Borough
Welsh footballers
Association football fullbacks
English Football League players
Tottenham Hotspur F.C. players
Newport County A.F.C. players
Bristol City F.C. players